Compulsive drinking may refer to: 
 Psychogenic polydipsia - compulsive drinking of water in the absence of physiological stimuli
 Potomania - compulsive drinking of beer
 Dipsomania - historical term for the compulsive drinking of alcohol
 Binge drinking